Peter Bos (born May 30, 1938) is an American rower. He competed in the men's eight event at the 1960 Summer Olympics. He graduated from United States Naval Academy and Harvard Business School.

After graduating, Bos worked for an international consulting company and later developed renewable energy power plants. He eventually retired with his wife in Naples.

References

1938 births
Living people
American male rowers
Olympic rowers of the United States
Rowers at the 1960 Summer Olympics
People from North Tonawanda, New York
United States Naval Academy alumni
Harvard Business School alumni